Earl Philip Benditt (April 15, 1916 – May 27, 1996) was an American pathologist, known for his research on hardening of the arteries. Benditt was a member of the National Academy of Sciences. Benditt published approximately 250 scientific papers. Benditt was a fellow of the American Association for the Advancement of Science and was a recipient of the Rous-Whipple Award as well as the Gold-Headed Cane from the American Association of Pathologists and Bacteriologists. Benditt was the Chair of the Department of Pathology at the University of Washington from 1957 to 1981. The National Academies Press called him "a preeminent twentieth-century experimental pathologist". The New York Times called him "a specialist in blood vessel and artery diseases".

Life and career 
Benditt was born in Philadelphia, Pennsylvania. He graduated from Swarthmore College in 1937, and then received M.D. from Harvard Medical School in 1941. He then worked in the faculty of the University of Chicago. In 1957 Benditt accepted a position of professor of pathology and the department chairman at the University of Washington.

References

External links
David Lagunoff and George M. Martin, "Earl Philip Benditt", Biographical Memoirs of the National Academy of Sciences (2002)

1916 births
1996 deaths
American pathologists
Harvard Medical School alumni
Members of the United States National Academy of Sciences
Scientists from Philadelphia
Physicians from Seattle
Swarthmore College alumni
University of Chicago faculty
University of Washington faculty
20th-century American physicians